Guéréda Airport  is a public use airport located near Guéréda, Wadi Fira, Chad.

See also
List of airports in Chad

References

External links 
 Airport record for Guéréda Airport at Landings.com

Airports in Chad
Wadi Fira Region